The  is a home video game console developed by Nichibutsu and released in Japan in 1983. The system was dedicated solely to playing video versions of popular board games. The console had no controllers; instead, players used a keyboard on the front of the console to input their actions.

Games 
A total of six games were released for the system, each being sold for 4,500 yen.

  - Nihon Bussan
  - Logitech
  - Nihon Bussan
  - Logitech
  - Logitech
  - Logitech

Sources 
Ultamate Console Database. My Vision, retrieved Feb 2, 2007

External links 

Home video game consoles
Third-generation video game consoles
Products introduced in 1983